EHC may refer to:

 Eastern Harbour Crossing, a transport tunnel in Hong Kong
 EHC Hoensbroek, a Dutch football club
 The Electric Hellfire Club, an American industrial metal band
 Encompass Health, an American healthcare provider
 Environmental Health Criteria (WHO)
 Everybody Hates Chris, a television sitcom which ran from 2005 to 2009.